Vittorio Michele Craxi, commonly known as Bobo Craxi (born 6 August 1964), is an Italian politician, son of the former Italian Prime Minister Bettino Craxi and brother of Stefania Craxi.

Biography 
Formerly a prominent member of the Italian Socialist Party and Socialist League, he was a founder of the New Italian Socialist Party in 2001.

He has been elected MP at the Chamber of Deputies of Italy for the riding of Trapani in the 2001 general election in the House of Freedoms centre-right coalition, serving until 2006.

He left the NPSI in late January 2006 after the rejection, by a judicial court, of his claim of having been elected as new national Secretary.

Thus he founded a new movement, The Socialists, of which he was the leader for a period. The party was part of the centre-left coalition The Union, and eventually merged into the refounded Socialist Party in 2007.

In 2006-2008 he served in the Prodi government as  undersecretary of Foreign Affairs, delegated to United Nations relationships.

Bobo Craxi was candidate among the ranks of PSI for the Regional Council of Lazio in 2010 and for the Senate in 2013, but on both occasions he was not elected.

On 24 October 2015 he founded Socialist Area, as internal faction of the Italian Socialist Party.

On the occasion of the 2022 Italian general election he was a candidate for the centre-left coalition in the single-member constituency "Sicily 1-02",Elezioni, Bobo Craxi corre per la Camera a Palermo: "Accetto la proposta del centrosinistra" but he got only 15% of the votes and he was not elected.

References

External links
 Personal website

1964 births
Living people
Politicians from Milan
People of Sicilian descent
Italian Socialist Party politicians
Socialist Party (Italy, 1996) politicians
New Italian Socialist Party politicians
Children of national leaders
20th-century Italian politicians
21st-century Italian politicians